Lacking an immune system, protective shell, or mobility, sponges have developed an ability to synthesize a variety of unusual compounds for survival.  C-nucleosides isolated from Caribbean Cryptotethya crypta, were the basis for the synthesis of zidovudine (AZT), aciclovir (Cyclovir), cytarabine (Depocyt), and cytarabine derivative gemcitabine (Gemzar).

Semisynthetic analogs of the sponge isolate jasplakinolide, were submitted to National Cancer Institute’s Biological Evaluation Committee in 2011.

Other marine isolates
Trabectedin, aplidine, didemnin, were isolated from sea squirts. Monomethyl auristatin E is a derivative of a dolastatin 10, a compound made by Dolabella auricularia. Bryostatins were first isolated from Bryozoa.

Salinosporamides are derived from Salinispora tropica. Ziconotide is derived from the sea snail Conus magus.

See also

Bacillus isolates
Biotechnology in pharmaceutical manufacturing
Fungal isolates
Marine pharmacognosy
Medicinal molds
Streptomyces isolates

References

Pharmaceutical isolates
Marine biology